el-Hajj Malik el-Shabazz (1925–1965) was an African-American human rights activist also known as Malcolm X and Malcolm Little.

Malik Shabazz may also refer to:

 Mike Tyson (born 1966), boxer who reportedly adopted the name "Malik Shabazz" following his conversion to Islam
 Malik Zulu Shabazz attorney former Chairman of the New Black Panther Party
 R-Truth (born 1972), wrestler who used the ring name K. Malik Shabaz